Judith Anne Reeder  (born August 17, 1948) is an American former competition swimmer.

Reeder was born in Pueblo, Colorado.  She trained with the Santa Clara Swim Club in Santa Clara, California, under coach George Haines.

As a 16-year-old, Reeder represented the United States at the 1964 Summer Olympics in Tokyo.  She swam for the gold medal-winning U.S. team in the preliminary heats of the women's 4×100-meter medley relay, but did not receive a medal.  Under the 1964 international swimming rules, only those relay swimmers who competed in the event final were eligible to receive medals.

References

External links
 

1948 births
Living people
American female breaststroke swimmers
Olympic swimmers of the United States
Sportspeople from Pueblo, Colorado
Swimmers at the 1964 Summer Olympics
21st-century American women